Slovenia competed at the 2012 Summer Olympics in London, United Kingdom. This was the nation's sixth consecutive appearance at the Summer Olympics. The Slovenian Olympic Committee sent the nation's third-largest delegation ever to the Games. A total of 65 athletes, 28 men and 37 women, competed in 15 sports. For the first time in its Olympic history, Slovenia was represented by more female than male athletes. Slalom kayaker and multiple-time world champion Peter Kauzer was the nation's flagbearer at the opening ceremony. The London Games also featured Slovenia's Olympic debut in triathlon.

The Slovenian team contained two Olympic medalists from the Beijing Olympics: hammer thrower and defending champion Primož Kozmus, and Finn sailor Vasilij Žbogar, who both competed at their fourth Olympics. Rifle shooter and former gold medalist Rajmond Debevec, the oldest athlete on the team at 49, became the first Slovenian to compete in eight Olympic games (including two appearances for Socialist Federal Republic of Yugoslavia). Rower and four-time medalist Iztok Čop competed at his sixth Olympics, while Čop's rowing partner Luka Špik and butterfly swimmer Peter Mankoč both made their fifth Olympic appearances.

Slovenian athletes earned four medals in London: one gold, one silver, and two bronze. All of Slovenia's medal winners had already won medals at one or more previous Olympics.

Medalists

Archery

Slovenia qualified one archer.

Athletics

Slovenian athletes achieved qualifying standards in the following athletics events (up to a maximum of 3 athletes in each event at the 'A' Standard, and 1 at the 'B' Standard):

Men
Track & road events

Field events

Women
Track & road events

Field events

Badminton

Canoeing

Slalom
Slovenia qualified boats for all slalom events.

Sprint

Qualification Legend: FA = Qualify to final (medal); FB = Qualify to final B (non-medal)

Cycling

Slovenia qualified athletes in the following events:

Road

Mountain biking

Gymnastics

Artistic
Women

Judo

Men

Women

Rowing

Slovenia qualified the following boats:
Men

Qualification Legend: FA=Final A (medal); FB=Final B (non-medal); FC=Final C (non-medal); FD=Final D (non-medal); FE=Final E (non-medal); FF=Final F (non-medal); SA/B=Semifinals A/B; SC/D=Semifinals C/D; SE/F=Semifinals E/F; QF=Quarterfinals; R=Repechage

Sailing

Slovenia qualified one boat for each of the following events:

Men

Women

 M = Medal race; EL = Eliminated – did not advance into the medal race

Shooting

Slovenia ensured berths in the following events:

Men

Women

Swimming

Slovenian swimmers achieved qualifying standards in the following events (up to a maximum of two swimmers in each event at the Olympic Qualifying Time (OQT), and 1 at the Olympic Selection Time (OST)):

Men

Women

Table tennis

Slovenia qualified one athlete for singles table tennis.

Taekwondo

Slovenia qualified 3 athletes.

Tennis

Slovenia qualified 4 players.

Triathlon

References

Nations at the 2012 Summer Olympics
2012
2012 in Slovenian sport